Cheryl Webb (born 3 October 1976 in Penrith, New South Wales), is an Australian race walker. Webb won the bronze medal in the 20 km race at the 2006 Commonwealth Games in Melbourne. She is self coached since 2004.

Webb made her international debut in 2004. She finished 38th in the 20 km race at the 2004 Summer Olympics and 21st in the same event at the 2005 World Championships in Athletics.

Achievements

Statistics
2010: Commonwealth Games - Delhi, India (5th)
2010: World Walking Cup - Chihuahua, Mexico (disqualified)
2009: World Championships - Berlin, Germany (disqualified)
2009: National Champion - Melbourne, Australia (fastest Australian female on Australian soil of all time over 20 km, 1.29.44)
2006: Commonwealth Games - Melbourne, Australia (3rd, 1.36.03)
2006: World Walking Cup - La Coruna, Spain (37th, 1.36.33)
2005: World Championships - Helsinki, Finland (21st, 1.33.58)
2004: Olympic Games - Athens, Greece (38th, 1.37.40)
2004: World Walking Cup - Naumburg, Germany (26th, 1.31.42)

References

1976 births
Living people
Australian female racewalkers
Olympic athletes of Australia
Athletes (track and field) at the 2004 Summer Olympics
Athletes (track and field) at the 2006 Commonwealth Games
Athletes (track and field) at the 2010 Commonwealth Games
Australian Institute of Sport track and field athletes
World Athletics Championships athletes for Australia
Commonwealth Games medallists in athletics
Commonwealth Games bronze medallists for Australia
20th-century Australian women
21st-century Australian women
Medallists at the 2006 Commonwealth Games